Maricris Gentz (née Fernandez, born 23 July 1979) is a Filipino former tennis player.

Gentz has career-high WTA rankings of 284 in singles, achieved on 18 October 1999, and 601 in doubles, set on 11 November 1991. She has won 4 singles titles on the ITF Women's Circuit.

Playing for Philippines  at the Fed Cup, Gentz has a win–loss record of 12–2.

ITF Circuit finals

Singles: 7 (4–3)

References

External links
 
 
 

1979 births
Living people
Filipino female tennis players
Southeast Asian Games gold medalists for the Philippines
Southeast Asian Games competitors for the Philippines
Southeast Asian Games silver medalists for the Philippines
Southeast Asian Games bronze medalists for the Philippines
Southeast Asian Games medalists in tennis
Competitors at the 1995 Southeast Asian Games
Competitors at the 1997 Southeast Asian Games
Competitors at the 1999 Southeast Asian Games
Tennis players at the 1998 Asian Games